Džemilić Planje is a village in the municipalities of Teslić (Republika Srpska) and Tešanj, Bosnia and Herzegovina.

Demographics 
According to the 2013 census, its population was 1,141, with all living in the Tešanj part thus none living in the Teslić part.

References

Populated places in Tešanj
Populated places in Teslić